Gelora Bangkalan Stadium is a football stadium in Bangkalan, Indonesia. It is located in Jalan Soekarno-Hatta, Bangkalan

History
The stadium was built in 2012 with the seating capacity of 15.000. It is located in Jalan Soekarno-Hatta, Bangkalan. The building of the stadium was also meant to support the bid of their neighbouring city Surabaya, for the 2019 Asian Games. It have their own food center located in the north area of the stadium.

Other uses
Persepam Madura United use this stadium for their home games. Persebaya Surabaya will also temporarily use this stadium for the 2013 Indonesian Premier League, because of the renovation of Gelora Bung Tomo Stadium.

References

External links
 Soccerway.com

Madura Island
Madura United F.C.
Buildings and structures in East Java
Sports venues in Indonesia
Football venues in Indonesia
Athletics (track and field) venues in Indonesia
Multi-purpose stadiums in Indonesia
Football venues in East Java
Athletics (track and field) venues in East Java
Sports venues completed in 2012
Persepam Madura